= Ensemble, et al. =

Percussion quartet

Ensemble, et al. is an indie, classical ensemble percussion quartet based in Brooklyn, New York. Founded by Ron Tucker, the quartet includes Charles Kessenich, J. Ross Marshall and Jeff Eng.

== Discography ==
- When the Tape Runs Out (2011)
- Present Point Passed (2014)
- The Slow Reveal (2017)
- patterns & improvisations, vol. 1 (2018)
